Yu Seong-won (also Ryu Seong-won) (died 1456) was a scholar-official of the early Joseon Dynasty, who is remembered as one of the six murdered ministers.  He was born to a yangban family of the Munhwa Ryu lineage, but his date of birth is not known.

Yu passed the lower examination 1444 and the higher examination in 1447.  He was shortly thereafter appointed to the Hall of Worthies by Sejong.  Yu was among the compilers of the first edition of the Classified Collection of Medical Prescriptions (yu bang yu chwi, 醫方類聚), together with other members of the Hall of Worthies.

In 1455, Sejo overthrew the reigning king Danjong.  Yu joined with other high officials in a conspiracy to restore Danjong to the throne.  This was discovered by the king shortly before it was to happen, and Yu committed suicide.

Yu's tomb lies today in Sayuksin Park in Noryangjin-dong, Dongjak-gu, Seoul.  It was moved there in the 1970s.

Notes

See also
List of Joseon Dynasty people
Joseon Dynasty politics

1456 deaths
Joseon scholar-officials
Year of birth unknown